Events in the year 1963 in Japan.

Incumbents
 Emperor: Hirohito
 Prime Minister: Hayato Ikeda (Liberal Democratic)
Chief Cabinet Secretary: Yasumi Kurogane
Chief Justice of the Supreme Court: Kōtarō Tanaka
President of the House of Representatives: Ichirō Kiyose until October 23, Naka Funada from December 7
President of the House of Councillors: Yūzō Shigemune

Governors
Aichi Prefecture: Mikine Kuwahara 
Akita Prefecture: Yūjirō Obata 
Aomori Prefecture: Iwao Yamazaki (until 26 January); Shunkichi Takeuchi (starting 2 March)
Chiba Prefecture: Hisaaki Kano (until 21 February); Taketo Tomonō (starting 17 April)
Ehime Prefecture: Sadatake Hisamatsu 
Fukui Prefecture: Eizō Kita 
Fukuoka Prefecture: Taichi Uzaki
Fukushima Prefecture: Zenichiro Satō 
Gifu Prefecture: Yukiyasu Matsuno 
Gunma Prefecture: Konroku Kanda 
Hiroshima Prefecture: Iduo Nagano 
Hokkaido: Kingo Machimura 
Hyogo Prefecture: Motohiko Kanai 
Ibaraki Prefecture: Nirō Iwakami 
Ishikawa Prefecture: Jūjitsu Taya (until 19 February); Yōichi Nakanishi (starting 20 February)
Iwate Prefecture: Senichi Abe (until 29 April); Tadashi Chida (starting 30 April)
Kagawa Prefecture: Masanori Kaneko 
Kagoshima Prefecture: Katsushi Terazono 
Kanagawa Prefecture: Iwataro Uchiyama 
Kochi Prefecture: Masumi Mizobuchi 
Kumamoto Prefecture: Kōsaku Teramoto 
Kyoto Prefecture: Torazō Ninagawa 
Mie Prefecture: Satoru Tanaka 
Miyagi Prefecture: Yoshio Miura 
Miyazaki Prefecture: Hiroshi Kuroki 
Nagano Prefecture: Gon'ichirō Nishizawa 
Nagasaki Prefecture: Katsuya Sato 
Nara Prefecture: Ryozo Okuda 
Niigata Prefecture: Juichiro Tsukada
Oita Prefecture: Kaoru Kinoshita 
Okayama Prefecture: Yukiharu Miki 
Osaka Prefecture: Gisen Satō 
Saga Prefecture: Sunao Ikeda 
Saitama Prefecture: Hiroshi Kurihara 
Shiga Prefecture: Kyujiro Taniguchi 
Shiname Prefecture: Choemon Tanabe 
Shizuoka Prefecture: Toshio Saitō 
Tochigi Prefecture: Nobuo Yokokawa 
Tokushima Prefecture: Kikutaro Hara 
Tokyo: Ryōtarō Azuma 
Tottori Prefecture: Jirō Ishiba 
Toyama Prefecture: Minoru Yoshida 
Wakayama Prefecture: Shinji Ono 
Yamagata Prefecture: Tōkichi Abiko 
Yamaguchi Prefecture: Masayuki Hashimoto 
Yamanashi Prefecture: Hisashi Amano

Events

 January and February - 1963 Snowstorm in Japan, a heavy snowstorm with blizzard, following avalanche hit in northeastern Honshu, according to Japan Fire and Disaster Management Agency confirmed report, 231 people lost their lives, 356 people were wounded. 
 February 10 - Five cities on northernmost part of Kyushu merge to become city of Kitakyushu
 February 26 - According to Japan Coast Guard official confirmed report, a passenger ship Tokiwa Maru sank by collision with logistic ship Richmond Maru off Kobe Port, Hyogo Prefecture, total 47 passengers and crew were fatalities. 
 April 19 – Amataro Sweets Teahouse, as predecessor of Colowide Restaurant Group, founded in Zushi, Kanagawa Prefecture.
 May 1 - Sayama Incident
 May 21 - Establishment of the Seppiko-Mineyama Prefectural Natural Park
 July 15 - Establishment of the Sanin Kaigan National Park
 July 24 - Establishment of the Chōkai Quasi-National Park
 August 8 - Establishment of the Zaō Quasi-National Park
 September 14 - Tokyo Convention
 November 9 - Mitsui Miike Coal Mine disaster - coal mine explosion kills 458.
 November 9 - Tsurumi rail accident - 161 deaths result from triple train disaster in Yokohama
 November 11 – Tokyo Electron was founded. 
 November 21 - General election -  Liberal Democratic Party win 283 out of 467 seats.
 December 7 - Decision on the Ryuichi Shimoda v. The State case

Educational institutions established
 Fukuyama City Junior College for Women
 Hakodate Otani College
 Kobe International University
 Niigata Woman's College
 Sanyo Women's College
 Seitoku Junior College of Nutrition
 Shiga Prefectural Ishiyama High School
 Taku High School
 Toyama Women's College
 Toyama University of International Studies
 Tsuruoka National College of Technology
 Tsuyama National College of Technology

Buildings and structures
 February 28 - Opening of Higashi-ginza Station
 November 20 - Commissioning of Otori Dam

Culture
 March 1 - Establishment of the National Museum of Modern Art, Kyoto

Arts and entertainment
For events in anime, see 1963 in anime. 
For Japanese films released this year, see List of Japanese films of 1963.
For events in television, see 1963 in Japanese television. 
 April 1 - First issue of Boy's Life magazine
 September 6 - Establishment of Crown Records record label 
 First issue of Margaret magazine
 Establishment of the Hiroshima Symphony Orchestra

Sports
In association football, see 1963 in Japanese football. The 1963 Emperor's Cup was won by Waseda University.

In baseball, see 1963 Nippon Professional Baseball season and 1963 Japan Series.

In motorsport, the first Japanese Grand Prix took place at the Suzuka Circuit.

In tennis, Japan was defeated in the Eastern zone final by India in the 1963 Davis Cup.

Establishment of the All-Japan Rugby Football Championship.

Births
January 10 - Tarō Kōno, politician
January 30 - Shōko Tsuda, voice actress
March 16 - Eiji Aonuma, game designer
March 20 - Hiroshi Watari, actor of 1983 Space Sheriff Series Uchuu Keiji Sharivan & 1986 Metal Hero Jikuu Senshi Spielban
March 24 - Keiichi Wada, actor of 1993 Super Sentai Gosei Sentai Dairanger as Fire Star/Ryou
March 26 - Natsuhiko Kyogoku, writer
March 28 - Chieko Honda, voice actress (d. 2013)
April 27 – Sadaaki Yoshimura, former professional baseball player 
May 5 – Kimiyasu Kudo, professional baseball coach and former pitcher  
May 12 - Toshiya Fuji, actor of 1990 Super Sentai of Last 80's and 90's Super Sentai Chikyuu Sentai Fiveman as Five Red/Gaku Hoshikawa.
August 7 - Hiroaki Hirata, voice actor
August 8
Rica Fukami, voice actress
Emi Shinohara, voice actress
August 9 – Zentarō Watanabe, music producer (d. 2021)
August 24 - Hideo Kojima, video-game director
September 17 - Masahiro Chono, professional wrestler
September 21 - Mamoru Samuragochi
October 12 - Satoshi Kon, anime director (d. 2010)
November 23 - Yoshino Takamori, voice actress
December 8 - Toshiaki Kawada, professional wrestler
December 9 – Empress Masako, empress of Japan
December 12 - Ai Orikasa, voice actress and singer
December 18 - Rikiya Koyama, voice actor
December 22 - Luna H. Mitani, Surrealist painter

Deaths
February 18 - Tokugawa Iemasa, politician, 17th head of former Tokugawa shogunate (b. 1884)
April 14 - Kodō Nomura, novelist and music critic (b. 1882)
June 11  -  Yuzo Kawashima,  film director (b. 1918)
September 15 - Gyosaku Morozumi, general (b. 1884)
December 2 - Nobutsuna Sasaki, tanka poet (b. 1872)
December 10 - Yōko Ōta, writer (b. 1906)
December 12 - Yasujirō Ozu, filmmaker (b. 1903)

See also
 1963 in Japanese television
 List of Japanese films of 1963

References

 
Japan
Years of the 20th century in Japan